"In My Mind" is a 2012 song by Australian house music producer Ivan Gough and house music duo Feenixpawl, featuring the vocals of indie pop musician Georgi Kay.

Axwell Mix

The song gained huge popularity when it was remixed by Axwell. The track appeared on Swedish House Mafia 2012 album Until Now when Axwell was part of the Swedish House Mafia that also included Steve Angello and Sebastian Ingrosso.

"In My Mind" peaked at number 29 on the ARIA Singles Chart and at number 51 on the Dutch Single Top 100 chart also appearing in the Tipparade in Belgium. The song spent 11 weeks at number one on the Australian component chart, ARIA Club Tracks. It was released on Neon / Axtone / Atlantic (Warner).

In 2013, it was nominated for a Grammy Award for Best Remixed Recording, Non-Classical.

Axwell also performed the song the 2012 Tomorrowland Festival. It was filmed for the official aftermovie of the festival. He also performed it at the same festival in 2013. With the renewed interest for the song, in 2018 Axwell and Ingrosso performed it as "Dreamer vs In My Mind" in the same festival held annually in Belgium. Steve Angello also played it during the same festival.

Charts

Flo Rida version
Owing to the success of the original, Flo Rida released a revamped and remixed version with additional lyrics featuring samplings from Georgi Kay. The release was entitled "In My Mind, Part 2". It appeared on Flo Rida's 2012 album Wild Ones. In addition to Ivan Gough, Aden Forte and Josh Soon (the latter two making the duo Feenixpawl) and Georgina Kingsley (real name of Georgi Kay), credits included Tramar Dillard for the additional lyrics for Flo Rida.

This version also became a minor hit in Australia in its own right, peaking at number 44 on the ARIA Singles Chart staying in the chart for two consecutive weeks.

In 2018, the song was re-worked and released as "In My Mind Part 3".

Charts

Dynoro and Gigi D'Agostino version

The song has been remixed by Lithuanian DJ Dynoro and Italian DJ Gigi D'Agostino. It uses the hook from "L'amour Toujours", a 1999 song by Gigi D'Agostino. It had been released prior in the same key as the original Axwell version (credited to just Dynoro) in January that year, reaching number 29 on the Austrian Ö3 Austria Top 40 chart.

The new remix was released on B1 Recordings, a joint venture with Sony Music. In July 2018, the song reached number one in the German and Austrian music charts. It was also a number one hit in Czech Republic, Finland, Hungary, Norway, Slovakia, Sweden, Switzerland, and a top 5 hit in Belgium and Ireland. It also made it to number five on the UK Singles Chart, becoming the first top five hit in Britain for both Dynoro and D'Agostino. The music video (released in March 2019) retitles the song to "In My Mind (In My Head)" and is credited to only Dynoro.

Charts

Weekly charts

Year-end charts

Decade-end charts

Certifications

See also
List of number-one hits of 2018 (Austria)
List of Ultratop 50 number-one singles of 2018
List of number-one singles of 2018 (Finland)
List of number-one hits of 2018 (Germany)
List of number-one singles of 2018 (Poland)
List of number-one hits of 2018 (Switzerland)
List of UK top 10 singles in 2018

References

2012 songs
2012 singles
2018 songs
2018 singles
Flo Rida songs
Gigi D'Agostino songs
Songs written by Gigi D'Agostino
Atlantic Records singles
Number-one singles in Austria
Number-one singles in the Commonwealth of Independent States
Number-one singles in the Czech Republic
Number-one singles in Finland
Number-one singles in Germany
Number-one singles in Norway
Number-one singles in Poland
Number-one singles in Russia
Number-one singles in Sweden
Number-one singles in Switzerland
Ultratop 50 Singles (Wallonia) number-one singles